The Semi-Tarrasch Defense is a chess opening characterized by the following moves:

1. d4 d5
2. c4 e6
3. Nc3 Nf6
4. Nf3 c5

The Semi-Tarrasch is a variation of the Queen's Gambit Declined (ECO codes D40 through D42).

General concepts
Unlike the regular Tarrasch, in the Semi-Tarrasch Defense Black does not accept an isolated pawn, since they intend to recapture on d5 with the knight (as after 5.cxd5, 5...exd5 has long been known to be dubious after 6.Bg5), but they cede a  advantage to White. The intended recapture with the f6-knight prevents Black from seamlessly transposing to the Semi-Tarrasch if White has played 4.Bg5. 
 
After 4...c5, White usually plays 5.cxd5 Nxd5 6.e3 or 6.e4, which leads to different types of middlegame play and has attracted the interest of strong players with both colors since the early twentieth century.

Symmetrical Variation
In this line, White forgoes the fianchetto, with its direct play against d5, opting to keep central tension for the moment by playing 5.e3, after which 5...Nc6 is the normal continuation. From this position, White may choose to inflict the isolated pawn on Black, accept the weakness themselves in return for active piece play, or play 6.a3, with a view to dxc5, followed by b4 and Bb2, aiming for positions in which the extra tempo will come in useful if Black keeps the symmetry; thus, 6...Ne4, once chosen by Bobby Fischer in his Candidates Match with Tigran Petrosian in 1971, gives a different turn.

Symmetrical Variation has ECO code D40.

See also
 List of chess openings
 List of chess openings named after people

References

 
 

Chess openings